Mighty Mac or Mighty Macs may refer to:

Mackinac Bridge, a suspension bridge in Michigan known as the Mighty Mac
Mighty Mac, nickname of the USS McKean (DD-784), a destroyer
Mighty Mac, nickname of the USS McClusky (FFG-41), a frigate
Mighty Mac, nickname of the USS Mackinac (AVP-13), a seaplane tender
The Mighty Mac, winning horse in the 1981 Powers Gold Cup and 1984 Cathcart Challenge Cup
Mighty Macs, nickname of the sports teams of Immaculata University, formerly Immaculata College
The Mighty Macs, a 2009 film about the women's basketball team of what was then Immaculata College
Mighty Mac, nickname of the sports teams of Bishop McNamara High School, Forestville, Maryland
Mighty Macs, nickname of the sports teams of Mother McAuley Liberal Arts High School, Chicago, Illinois

Nicknames